The 1953 Harvard Crimson football team was an American football team that represented Harvard University during the 1953 college football season. In their fourth year under head coach Lloyd Jordan, the Crimson compiled a 6–2 record and outscored opponents 146 to 78. Richard J. Clasby was the team captain.

Harvard played its home games at Harvard Stadium in the Allston neighborhood of Boston, Massachusetts.

Schedule

References

Harvard
Harvard Crimson football seasons
Harvard Crimson football
1950s in Boston